Malabar Hill (ISO: Malabār Hill [mələbaːɾ]) is a hillock and upmarket residential neighbourhood in South Mumbai, Maharashtra, India. Malabar Hill is one of the most exclusive residential areas in Mumbai. It is home to several business tycoons and film personalities. Notable residents include Adi Godrej, Radhakishan Damani, Chandrasekaran Natarajan, Cyrus Broacha, Ashish Pandey the Birla family, Shashi Ruia and family, Pallonji Mistry, the Jindal family, the Petit family, the Shah family, the Sanghvi family, the Bilakhia family, and the Thakkar family . As of 2014 it is one of the most expensive areas in the world regularly featuring in the top 10 world wide localities.

Prominent landmarks include the Chief Minister of Maharashtra's Bungalow, Government Guest House Sahyadri, official residences of VVIP state officials and additionally the Hanging Gardens, Jain Temple and Banganga Tank.

History

Malabar Hill is the location of the Walkeshwar Temple, founded by the Silhara kings. The original temple was destroyed by the Portuguese, but rebuilt again in 1715 by Rama Kamath, and by 1860, 10 to 20 other temples were built in the region.

Mountstuart Elphinstone built the first bungalow in Malabar Hill while he was Governor of Bombay, between 1819 and 1827. Following his example, the place soon became an affluent locality, as it remains today.

Overview

Raj Bhavan, the official residence of the governor of Maharashtra, 'Varsha', which is the official residence of the Chief Minister of Maharashtra, 'Glenogle' the official residence of the General Manager of Central Railway (erstwhile Great Indian Peninsula Railway) are located here.

An unhindered view of Back Bay, with the Girgaon Chowpatty beach in the foreground, and the Nariman Point skyline in the background is one of the reasons for the high real estate prices. In January 2012, Maheshwari House was (partly) sold to industrialist Sajjan Jindal of Jindal Steel for 400 crores. The most expensive private residence lies just outside Malabar Hill on Altamount Road off Pedder Road, namely Antilia, the 27-storey, billion-dollar tower in Mumbai, owned by India's second richest and the world's tenth-richest person Mukesh Ambani, the chairman of Reliance Industries.

Buses only started serving this area during World War II.

South Court (informally known as the 'Jinnah House'), the former residence of Mohammad Ali Jinnah, founder of Pakistan is also present here, but is closed to public due to property disputes.

Also of note in the Malabar Hill district, there is a cremation ground that sits near the sea which is home to the samadhi shrines of several famous Indian saints. Notably among them is the samadhi shrine of the guru of Shri Nisargadatta Maharaj, who was Shri Siddharameshwar Maharaj, as well as the samadhi shrine of his devoted disciple Shri Ranjit Maharaj. 

Amongst the notable people born in Malabar Hill included Douglas Jardine, the English cricketer who captained England during the Bodyline tour of Australia in 1932-33.

Gallery

References

 http://www.amazingmaharashtra.com/2013/04/malabar-hill.html

Neighbourhoods in Mumbai
Hills of Mumbai